Sotoroi September (17 September) is a Bengali family drama film directed by Amitabha Bhattacharya and produced by Rupa Dutta under the banner of Camellia Films. The film starring Soham Chakraborty and Arunima Ghosh, is about a young couple, Neel and Labanya, who belong to a joint family, and have come to Kolkata from the suburbs. The film was released theatrically on 20 September 2019.

Plot
Neel and Labanya, a working couple of Kolkata having no time to enjoy a happy married life. Both of them are always busy for earning money. Finally, they file a divorce case. This is the story of how they understand the true meaning of family life.

Cast
 Soham Chakraborty as Neel
 Arunima Ghosh as Labanya
 Biswajit Chakraborty
 Papiya Adhikari
 Anindita Bose
 Surajeet Banerjee
 Sanjeeb Sarkar
 Pradeep Bhattacharya
 Madhumita Chakraborty
 Ambarish Bhattacharya
 Rishab Basu
 Soham Maitra
 Himika Patra
 Arup Jaigirdar
 Soma Indu Dey
 Sanchita Maitra
 Srabani Ghosh
 Kohima Basu
 Biswajit Mukherjee

References

External links

2019 films
2019 drama films
Bengali-language Indian films
2010s Bengali-language films
Indian drama films